Conor Gleeson (born 10 October 1996) is an Irish hurler who plays in midfield for the Waterford senior team and plays his club hurling and football with The Nire–Fourmilewater.

On 13 August 2017, Gleeson was sent off in the All-Ireland semi-final against Cork and missed the 2017 All-Ireland Final after he was handed a one-match ban.

References 

Waterford inter-county hurlers
Fourmilewater hurlers
Living people
1996 births